Still Waters Run Deep is a 1970 album by the American vocal group Four Tops.

Reception

Released in March 1970 on the Motown label. Produced by longtime Norman Whitfield associate Frank Wilson, the album returned (the) Four Tops to the Top 40 on the Billboard album chart where it remained for 42 weeks peaking at #21. The album yielded the popular Top 30 hits, "Still Water (Love)" (#11), which was co-written by Smokey Robinson and their cover of "It's All in the Game" (#24), which featured rare co-leads by Four Tops members Abdul "Duke" Fakir, Renaldo "Obie" Benson and Lawrence Payton singing alongside prominent lead Levi Stubbs. The album also served as inspiration behind singer Marvin Gaye's What's Going On, the hit title track, which was written by Benson.

Track listing 

Side One
"Still Water (Love)" (Smokey Robinson, Frank Wilson) 3:09
"Reflections" (Holland–Dozier–Holland) 3:25
"It's All in the Game" (Charles Dawes, Carl Sigman) 2:44
"Everybody's Talkin'" (Fred Neil) 2:53
"Love is the Answer" (Smokey Robinson, Kathy Wakefield, Frank Wilson) 2:26

Side Two
"I Wish I Were Your Mirror" (Pam Sawyer, Frank Wilson) 3:09
"Elusive Butterfly" (Bob Lind) 3:07
"Bring Me Together" (Kathy Wakefield, Frank Wilson) 2:59
"L.A. (My Town)" (Sherlie Matthews) 3:09
"Still Water (Peace)" (Smokey Robinson, Frank Wilson) 2:42

Personnel

Four Tops
Levi Stubbs - lead vocals (baritone)
Abdul Fakir - tenor vocals
Lawrence Payton - tenor vocals
Renaldo Benson - bass vocals (lead singer on Side 1 Track 3)

Others
David Van DePitte, Jerry Long, Jimmy Roach - arrangers
The Funk Brothers - instrumentation
Marv Tarplin - guitar
Brenda Joyce Evans, Billie Rae Calvin, and The Andantes - additional backing vocals
Curtis McNair - art direction
Larry Raphael - photography

Charts

Singles

References

External links
 Four Tops - Still Waters Run Deep at Discogs

1970 albums
Four Tops albums
Motown albums
Albums produced by Frank Wilson (musician)
Albums produced by Smokey Robinson
Albums recorded at Hitsville U.S.A.